The Zygaeninae are a subfamily of the Zygaenidae family of moths. These are day-flying moths. Species of the genus Zygaena are native to the West Palearctic, while the genus Reissita is found on the Arabian Peninsula. They are able to biosynthesise hydrogen cyanide, and their bright patterns are warning colours to potential predators.

Genera
 Neurosymploca Wallengren, 1858
 Praezygaena Alberti, 1954
 Reissita Tremewan, 1959
 Zutulba Kirby, 1892
 Zygaena Fabricius, 1775

External links